The crescent shiner (Luxilus cerasinus) is a freshwater ray-finned fish in the family Cyprinidae, the carps and minnows. It occurs in the James, Roanoke, Chowan, New, and the extreme upper Cape Fear River drainages in Virginia and North Carolina. Its preferred habitat is rocky and sandy pools and runs of headwaters, creeks and small rivers.

References

http://fl.biology.usgs.gov/Southeastern_Aquatic_Fauna/Freshwater_Fishes/Fish_Biographies_1/fish_biographies_1.html

Luxilus
Freshwater fish of the United States
Fish described in 1868